Kathie Emma Nukon (born January 8, 1947 in Old Crow, Yukon) is a Canadian former politician, who represented the electoral district of Old Crow in the Yukon Legislative Assembly from 1982 to 1985. She was a member of the Yukon Progressive Conservative Party.

The daughter of a trading post owner in Old Crow, Nukon studied in Whitehorse to be a nursing assistant, but worked mainly as an office manager and bookkeeper in her father's store until her election to the legislature.

She ran again as a Yukon Party candidate in the 2000 election, but was not re-elected to the legislature.

Nukon also served on the band council of the Vuntut Gwitchin First Nation from 1996 to 1998 and from 2006 to 2012.

References

1947 births
Living people
20th-century First Nations people
21st-century First Nations people
First Nations politicians
First Nations women in politics
Vuntut Gwitchin people
Women MLAs in Yukon
Yukon Party MLAs
20th-century Canadian women politicians